Dave Denine is a former Canadian politician in Newfoundland and Labrador, Canada. He served in the provincial cabinet from 2007 to 2011 as Minister of Intergovernmental Affairs.

Denine represented the district of Mount Pearl South in the Newfoundland and Labrador House of Assembly from 2003 to 2007 as a member of the Progressive Conservative Party. Denine was sworn in as the Minister of Municipal Affairs following the 2007 provincial election and later served as Minister of Intergovernmental Affairs.

Denine announced on July 12, 2011, that he would not be seeking re-election in that year's general election.

References

Members of the Executive Council of Newfoundland and Labrador
Progressive Conservative Party of Newfoundland and Labrador MHAs
Living people
Mayors of Mount Pearl
21st-century Canadian politicians
Year of birth missing (living people)
Newfoundland and Labrador municipal councillors